Eduardo Guillermo "Lalo" Kapstein Suckel (28 March 1914 – 1997) was a Chilean basketball player. He competed in the 1936 Summer Olympics and the 1948 Summer Olympics.

References

External links

1914 births
1997 deaths
Chilean men's basketball players
Olympic basketball players of Chile
Basketball players at the 1936 Summer Olympics
Basketball players at the 1948 Summer Olympics